The following is a timeline of the COVID-19 pandemic in Japan.

Background
The COVID-19 pandemic in Japan can be divided into five waves based on the genome sequence of the country's COVID-19 virus. The National Institute of Infectious Diseases (Japan) (NIID) has determined from its genetic research that the COVID-19 variant of the first wave is derived from the Wuhan type that is prevalent in patients from China and East Asia.  After entering Japan in January through travellers and returnees from China, the virus resulted in numerous infection clusters across the country before moving towards its disappearance in March. Japanese medical surveillance confirmed its first case of the virus on 16 January in a resident of Kanagawa Prefecture who had returned from Wuhan.

The first wave was followed by a second one that originated from a COVID-19 variant of the European type that is traced back to early patients from France, Italy, Sweden, and the United Kingdom. Japanese medical surveillance detected the second wave on 26 March when the government's expert panel concluded the likelihood of a new outbreak caused by travellers and returnees from Europe and the United States between 11 and 23 March.  The NIID has established that the majority of viruses spreading in Japan since March is the European type. This has led it to conclude that the data "strongly suggests" that the Japanese government has succeeded in containing the Wuhan variant and that it is the European variant that is spreading across the country.

Initial outbreak (January–March 2020)

January 2020 
On 16 January, Kanagawa Prefecture confirmed its first case of COVID-19 when a man in his 30s who had previously travelled to Wuhan tested positive for it, marking the first confirmed case in Japan.

On 24 January, Tokyo Metropolis confirmed its first case of COVID-19. The Japanese government announced that it would provide repatriation services for all Japanese citizens in Hubei Province on that same day.  Officials negotiated with Chinese authorities to dispatch five chartered flights to Wuhan from 29 January to 17 February.

He also designated the disease as a "quarantinable infectious disease" under the Quarantine Act. On 30 January, Abe announced the establishment of a national task force to oversee the government's countermeasures against the novel coronavirus.

On 28 January, Nara Prefecture and Hokkaido Prefecture confirmed their first cases of COVID-19. On 29 January, Osaka Prefecture reported its first case on 29 January, followed by Mie Prefecture and Kyoto Prefecture on 30 January, and Chiba Prefecture on 31 January.

February 2020 
On 1 February, a passenger of the Diamond Princess cruise ship, who had visited Hong Kong on 25 January, tested positive for COVID-19. The ship received quarantine orders from the Japanese government in Naha that day. 

On 3 February, the government announced entry restrictions for foreign citizens who had travelled in Hubei Province or had a Chinese passport issued from there. The Diamond Princess arrived at Yokohama and was placed under government quarantine.

On 5 February, the government announced that several passengers of the Diamond Princess had tested positive for COVID-19.

On 12 February, the Japanese government announced entry restrictions for all foreign citizens who had travelled in Zhejiang Province or had a Chinese passport issued from there.

On 13 February, Wakayama Prefecture confirmed its first case of COVID-19. Japan announced its first COVID-19 fatality, a woman in her 80s from Kanagawa Prefecture. It was only the third COVID-19 death outside mainland China.

On 14 February, Okinawa Prefecture confirmed its first case of COVID-19.

On 15 February, Aichi Prefecture reported its first case.

On 19 February, the Japanese government completed testing of the 3,011 passengers on the Diamond Princess.

On 20 February, Saitama and Fukuoka Prefectures confirmed their first cases of COVID-19. 

On 21 February, Ishikawa Prefecture and Kumamoto Prefecture reported their first cases. The Japanese government began disembarking passengers from the Diamond Princess.

On 22 February, Tochigi Prefecture reported its first case.

On 23 February, the US State Department raised its travel alert for Japan to level 2 on the four-level advisory scale due to the "sustained community spread" of COVID-19 within the country.

On 25 February, Nagano and Tokushima Prefectures reported their first cases.

On 26 February, Gifu Prefecture reported its first case.

On 27 February, Shinzo Abe requested the closure of all elementary, junior high, and high schools from 2 March to the end of spring vacations in early April.

On 28 February, Hokkaido Prefecture declared a state of emergency over the coronavirus and requested its residents to refrain from going outside. Shizuoka Prefecture confirmed its first case of COVID-19 on that same day.

On 29 February, Miyagi Prefecture, Kochi Prefecture, and Niigata Prefecture confirmed their first cases of COVID-19.

March 2020 
On 1 March, Hyogo Prefecture confirmed its first case of COVID-19. Ehime Prefecture reported its first case on 2 March, followed by Oita Prefecture on 3 March, Yamaguchi Prefecture and Miyazaki Prefecture on 4 March, Shiga Prefecture on 5 March, Akita Prefecture and Yamanashi Prefecture on 6 March, and Hiroshima Prefecture, and Gunma Prefecture on 7 March.

On 2 March, schools were closed in almost all prefectures. Expanded rules for governmental paid leave for workers was announced.

On 5 March, Japan announced quarantine restrictions for all visitors arriving from China and South Korea. On 6 March, the South Korean government protested the restrictions by suspending visas for all Japanese citizens travelling to South Korea.

On 10 March, Japan officially classed the coronavirus outbreak as a national emergency. The government announced a 1 trillion yen ($9.6 billion) emergency package for businesses, including zero-interest loans for small and midsize companies and subsidies for freelance workers. Prime Minister Shinzo Abe asked that large events be cancelled or postponed so that measures for containing the virus could be evaluated.

On 12 March, Japan reported 4 deaths from COVID-19.

On 13 March, Saga Prefecture confirmed its first case of COVID-19. Nagasaki Prefecture reported its first case on 14 March, followed by Ibaraki Prefecture and Kagawa Prefecture on 17 March, and Fukui Prefecture on 18 March.

On 16 March, the Japanese government announced it would expand entry restrictions to all foreign citizens arriving from four additional countries. The restrictions applied to three areas in Spain (including Madrid), four areas in Italy (including the northern region of Liguria), Switzerland's Ticino region, and all of Iceland.

On 19 March, the governors of Osaka and Hyogo prefectures asked residents to avoid nonessential travel between the two neighbouring prefectures over the three-day weekend starting on 20 March to contain the spread of the coronavirus. The three-week state of emergency in Hokkaido was lifted on that same day.

On 22 March, Okayama Prefecture confirmed its first case of COVID-19 and requested its residents to refrain from visiting the neighboring prefectures of Hyogo and Osaka. Aomori Prefecture reported its first case on 23 March, followed by Gifu Prefecture on 26 March.

On 23 March, Tokyo governor Yuriko Koike warned residents that a lockdown might be the only way against the disease if infections were to surge in Tokyo as she urged people to cooperate with government countermeasures.

On 24 March, the International Olympic Committee (IOC) and Tokyo Organising Committee of the Olympic and Paralympic Games announced a one-year postponement of the 2020 Summer Olympics.

On 25 March, MHLW officials announced 71 people tested positive, including 41 cases in Tokyo. Governor Yuriko Koike held an emergency press conference in the late afternoon to reaffirm the seriousness of the situation and request people remain inside as much as possible for the next two weeks. Panic buying began following the announcement.

On 26 March, several governors of the Greater Tokyo Area, including Chiba, Kanagawa, Saitama, and Yamanashi, strongly urged residents to follow stay-at-home requests to prevent a surge in infections that could cause a "critical phase". In Tokyo, residents were asked to work from home and refrain from going out at night and on the weekend.

On 27 March, MHLW officials announced 112 people had tested positive in a single day, including three Hanshin Tigers professional baseball players.

On 28 March, Abe held an hour-long press briefing about the economic measures being prepared by the Japanese government amid considerable concerns of an "explosive spread of overflowing infections", which was creating regional self-isolation requests around Japan, including in Tokyo, Osaka, Hyogo, and Aichi. Abe's wife was accused of attending a hanami party in defiance of COVID restrictions. Abe said she merely took pictures in front of some cherry trees after going to a restaurant.

On 28 March, 63 people tested positive in Tokyo.

On 29 March, MHLW officials announced 194 people had tested positive for the virus, including 58 people at a facility for the disabled in Tōnoshō, Chiba Prefecture. That day, 68 people tested positive in Tokyo, for a total of 430 confirmed cases of COVID-19, the largest among Japan's 47 prefectures.

On 30 March, tarento and comedian Ken Shimura died at the age of 70 from complications of a COVID-19 infection. It was the first major COVID death in Japan's entertainment industry.

On 30 March, Fukuoka City announced confirmed cases in a woman in her 20s and her infant daughter. On 30 March, Toyama prefecture announced its first case, and a Kyoto government official announced that the Kyoto Sangyo University had undergone "a cluster of infections"—including two students who had recently returned from travel to Europe.

On 31 March, Tokyo reported 7 deaths and 78 new infections, for a total of 521 cases. 10 of the new cases were suspected to be tied to Eiju General Hospital in Taito Ward. Calls were made for the prime minister to declare a state of emergency, but both Prime Minister Abe and Chief Cabinet Secretary Suga denied that it was necessary.

April 2020–June 2020

April 2020 

On 1 April, the government established a team to determine Japan's response to the coronavirus outbreak as well as other national challenges.

On 3 April, Japan expanded its entry ban to cover 73 countries and regions, barring entrance to the country for visitors from 73 countries and regions. The same day, Immigration Services Agency of Japan said it would extend the deadline for foreigners to renew their visas, so that their service centers would not be overwhelmed by demand.

On 4 April, 118 new cases were announced in Tokyo. Public pressure increased for Prime Minister Shinzo Abe to declare a state of emergency, which he had been reluctant to do. 

On 6 April, 83 new coronavirus cases were reported in Tokyo. The city's government planned to transfer patients with mild symptoms out of hospitals and into quarantine facilities in order to increase beds for patients with serious symptoms.

On 7 April, Abe proclaimed a state of emergency from 8 April to 6 May for Tokyo and the prefectures of Kanagawa, Saitama, Chiba, Osaka, Hyogo and Fukuoka, but said there would be no lockdown measures. It was the first time a state of emergency had been declared in Japan. According to the Prime Minister, the pandemic had created the worst economic crisis in Japan since World War II.

On 8 April, Tokyo confirmed 144 new coronavirus cases. Infection routes could not be determined for over 60% of them. 

On 10 April, Nippon Professional Baseball and the J-League cancelled all games in April.

On 11 April, 197 new coronavirus cases were confirmed in Tokyo, for a total of over 1,900 cases in the city.

Narita International Airport closed one of its two runways on 12 April due to an 85 percent reduction in traffic caused by the virus.

On April 13, a second wave of infections hit Hokkaido, prompting the prefectural government to declare a second state of emergency that closed schools and that asked residents to avoid non-essential trips.

On 16 April, the Japanese government expanded the state of emergency to include all 47 prefectures in Japan. The government also announced a plan to give 100,000 yen to every registered resident of Japan.

On 19 April, first coronavirus death in Chūgoku region was reported due to disease outbreak of COVID-19 in Hiroshima Prefecture.

On 20 April, according to the Ministry of Internal Affairs and Communications, 25 people died in a single day, the highest number of daily nationwide confirmed fatalities.

On 21 April, former chairman of Omron Yoshio Tateishi (立石義雄) died due to COVID-19 in Kyoto, according to the Omron website.

On 23 April 29 persons nationwide were confirmed to have died, including actress Kumiko Okae (岡江久美子) and actor Shu Wada (和田周), according to a JMIAC confirmed report.

According to a National Police Agency of Japan confirmed report, 73 police officers had tested positive since February, and there were an additional 15 confirmed deaths from COVID-19 from March found in people who had died outside hospitals, mainly most of people who were homeless and had been tested after death due to limited testing.

On 27 April, minister Yasutoshi Nishimura was tested for COVID-19 following contact with an infected person, although Nishimura did not have any symptoms. He was criticized for taking priority over citizens with symptoms at a time when tests were difficult to come by.

On 30 April, Prime Minister Abe announced that Japanese authorities were having difficulty increasing the availability of COVID tests.

May 2020 
On 1 May, distribution of stimulus payments began for residents of small towns and villages.

On 3 May, Prime Minister Abe announced that it was unlikely that the government would be able to enact his 2018 plan to revise Article 9 of the Japanese Constitution, known as the "Peace Constitution", as a result of disruption caused by the pandemic. Democratic Party for the People leader Yuichiro Tamaki recommended resuming the project after the pandemic had ended. 

On 4 May, the Japanese government extended the nationwide state of emergency until the end of May, as new infections had not slowed enough. The prime minister stated that restrictions would be reassessed after 14 May.

As of 6 May, before Governor Hirofumi Yoshimura announced his own standards for Osaka Prefecture, which is named as "Osaka model", he expressed his desire for the Japanese government to clearly describe the requirements to lift the state of emergency. Later, Minister Nishimura said that the comments were somewhat confusing and that he would set standards later. Later, Yoshimura changed the critical tone of the remarks and apologize to the Minister Nishimura, on Twitter. However, he expressed his anxiety and disappointment with the government, strongly stating that he would reveal his beliefs as a politician.

On 7 May, schools in the lightly affected prefectures of Aomori and Tottori were reopened.

On 8 May, strict guidelines for testing were relaxed in order to allow more people to be tested.

On May 9, Tōhoku region had its first reported COVID-19 death.

On 10 May, Health, Labor and Welfare Minister Kato Katsunobu announced plans to provide government subsidies to assist businesses with paying workers, following COVID-related impacts to sales.

On 11 May, Japan's Ministry of Health, Labour and Welfare announced plans to approve a COVID-19 antigen test kit to provide faster results than the PCR test. Yuriko Koike announced that paperwork issues had resulted in a miscount of cases in Tokyo. 111 were omitted and 35 were duplicated, for a net increase of 76. These were set to be added to the total case count for Tokyo on 12 May.

In the midst of this, criticism and concern are growing as there is not enough discussion about increasing the supply of the coronavirus test, and the issue of the extension of the retirement age of the prosecutor Kurokawa is being led by the Abe Cabinet. Yukio Edano insisted that it was not right for the Japanese government to push the bill through turmoil during a disaster like a thief in a fire scene. A few days later, Japanese Government and Abe Cabinet declared that they would rescind the legal change of prosecutor's retirement.

On 14 May, Japanese government officials and PM Shinzo Abe declared that they had decided to suspend the emergency of 39 prefectures, except for 4 prefectures in Kanto, 3 prefectures in Kinki, and Hokkaido, which are feared of collapse of medical system. At the press conference, Prime Minister Abe urged to be vigilant even if the emergency was lifted, citing examples from South Korea, Germany, and Singapore as comparison targets. It was the day after the news was reported widely that a sumo wrestler in his 20s died after suffering from a viral infection for a month.

On 18 May, it was officially reported around the global market that Japan's economy officially enters recession with 'Much worse' expected from coronavirus for first time since 2015.

On 21 May, the state of emergency is lifted in 3 prefectures in the Kinki region after they had cleared the threshold of having new infections below 0.5 per 100,000 people in the past week, resulting a total of 42 out of the 47 prefectures to be out of the state of emergency.

On 24 May, Fukuoka Prefecture announced a total of four confirmed cases, including one re-positive case confirmed in Fukuoka City, and three infected cases related to Kitakyushu City.

On 25 May, PM Shinzo Abe has announced he's lifting the government's emergency declaration for the five prefectures where it's still in place.

On 28 May, a 117.1 trillion yen relief package was approved by Abe and his cabinet. The purpose of the package is to provide financial relief for companies and individuals that have been struggling due to the impact of the virus.

On 28 May, the number of infected people in Kitakyushu has risen to 22 in the past 5 days, and the infection route of 17 of them is unknown.

On 30 May, in Kitakyushu City, 69 people have been confirmed to have been infected in 7 days from the 23rd to the 29th of this month, and the infection route of 27 of them is unknown.

On 31 May, the city of Kitakyushu closed public facilities after 12 people tested positive for COVID-19.

June 2020 
On 2 June, 34 new cases were reported in Tokyo.

On 5 June, Hitachi, Toshiba, and Fujirebio announced they would collaborate to produce antigen-testing kits.

On 6 June, following rising infection numbers, Japanese economic revitalization minister Yasutoshi Nishimura said that he and Tokyo Governor Yuriko Koike would discuss prevention measures for young people and nightlife districts.

On 8 June, it was reported that approval ratings for Prime Minister Abe had dropped as a result of his handling of the pandemic.

On 10 June, the Tokyo Olympic Committee announced that the postponed Summer Olympics, to be held in 2021, would be "simplified" to reduce their cost and reduce the spread of COVID-19.

On 11 June, the Tokyo metropolitan government lifted its warning about a possible increase in the number of coronavirus infections in the capital.

On 12 June, there were 61 new cases and 3 deaths. Japan eased restrictions on residents returning after foreign travel.

As of 13 June, Tokyo was seeing increased participation in nightlife following removal of restrictions on venues. Management of these establishments were required to record customer contact information for contact tracing, and were requested to maintain social distancing within their venues.

On 14 June, Japan reported 54 new cases, including 18 infections of nightlife employees in Shinjuku district. Hokkaido reported 7 cases, for a total of 1170. Kitakyushu reported 2 new cases. Japan's minister in charge of coronavirus response, the governor of Tokyo, and mayor of Tokyo's Shinjuku Ward met and agreed to cooperate on measures to curb the rising trend of coronavirus infections in the capital's nightlife districts. In a survey, doctors reported declining work conditions at over 20% of hospitals, including "dismissals, salary reductions and forced closures". 

On 15 June, 72 new cases were reported, including 48 in Tokyo, 6 in Hokkaido, and 1 in Kitakyushu.

On 17 June, it was reported that foreign travel to Japan had dropped to an all-time low in May. Numbers had been declining monthly since October 2019 as a result of COVID-19. Imports and exports had the largest year-to-year drop in over a decade.

On 18 June, 70 new cases were reported, with 41 in Tokyo. The Japanese government announced they were preparing to remove some restrictions. It was reported that Japan was reportedly the least satisfied with government support to businesses, in a survey covering the US, France, Germany, Britain, Sweden and Japan. 

On 19 June, the Japanese government launched its contact tracing app, COCOA, but users reported having difficulty finding and downloading it. Following delays, the 2020 Nippon Professional Baseball season started. Japanese clothing retailer Uniqlo launched a washable cloth mask. Demand was significant, resulting in their website crashing and long queues at brick and mortar stores.

On 21 June, there were 56 new cases, for a total of 17,931. 35 were in Tokyo, and 9 of these were discovered by inspection at two host clubs in Shinjuku. Osaka Prefecture reported a cluster of 3 infections. 

On 24 June, 55 cases were confirmed in Tokyo, the highest since the declaration of emergency. The total number of cases in Tokyo was 5,895. 

On 25 June, it was confirmed that the Japanese government would abolish the Expert Meeting without any signals, although members of Expert Meeting were not notified and some lawmakers of opposition parties are demanding the explanation of sudden abolishing process. Later on 29 June, Nishimura expressed regret for a remark he made. He said last week that he planned to abolish the expert panel and replace it with a newly set up subcommittee. He said that "abolish" was too strong a word.

As of 25 June, The Tokyo Metropolitan Government said Thursday it had confirmed 48 new novel coronavirus infections, marking more than 40 cases daily for the second straight day. As of Wednesday, the weekly average of daily new cases stood at 37.9 with untraceable cases comprising 45.7 percent, while the total number of weekly cases had increased by 27 percent. The Tokyo Metropolitan Government had previously said they would consider reissuing business closure requests if the weekly average of new cases exceeded 50, more than half were untraceable and new cases had doubled in the span of a week.

As of 25 June, in Japan, 82 new coronavirus infections were confirmed during the day on the 25th. In particular, the number of new confirmed persons in Tokyo, the capital city, was 48, the second highest level after the emergency declaration issued by the Japanese government was lifted on the 25th of last month. According to Tokyo, 21 cases out of 48 people were employees and customers working in the entertainment district. Yasushi Nishimura, who is unexpectedly in charge of Japan's Economy, Finance and Renewal as Minister, said at a press conference on the day, "We have been analysing the opinions of experts and repeating opinions." Governor Yuri Koike of Tokyo explained, "As experts analysed, the number of benign patients is not increasing rapidly, and the number of hospitalized and severe patients is not increasing, so it is not a secondary epidemic."

On 26 June, there were over 100 new cases nationally. Tokyo confirmed 54 new cases.

On 28 June, Tokyo recorded 60 new coronavirus cases. Tokyo Governor Yuriko Koike denied that it was a "second wave" of COVID-19. Most of the new cases were associated with entertainment facilities and public spaces such as schools and offices.

On 29 June, Yomiuri Shimbun reported that more people considers infection of hCoV-2019 would be transgression of the individual in Japan, quoting the survey of prof. Miura. Professor Miura said, "In Japan, there is a strong tendency to blame people who are supposed to be "victims" not only for corona (COVID-19), but for women suffering from demons, "it is worse to go out at midnight." There is also a possibility that such an awareness may lead to the idea that infection is regarded as the responsibility of the individual.”

As of 29 June, it was reported that Tokyo recorded 58 confirmed cases and Japan recorded over 100 people were confirmed positive for new coronavirus. Among them, from Tokyo area, 80% of people were in their 20s and 30s, there were 24 people who were believed to have transmitted the disease and over 30 cases were related to the nightlife district. In Tokyo, 54 people were found infected, exceeding 50 for five consecutive days. It is believed that the infection spread from the "night town" to the "home" during March–April when the infection spread in Tokyo. Furthermore, in Kanagawa Prefecture, 31 people were confirmed to have contracted the disease, including 26 employees of the same host club in Naka Ward, Yokohama.

On 30 June, 130 new cases were reported, with 54 in Tokyo. 15 of the Tokyo cases were associated with the nightlife district.

July 2020

July 1–7 
On July 1, Tokyo reported 67 new cases, many of which were tied to nightlife venues in Shinjuku and Ikebukuro. 10 cases were confirmed in Osaka Prefecture. 

On 2 July, 190 new cases were confirmed nationwide, the greatest number since the end of the state of emergency on 25 May. Tokyo reported 107 new cases. The Ministry of Health, Labour and Welfare reported that over 30,000 people had lost work due to the pandemic. 

On 3 July, 250 new cases of COVID were confirmed nationwide. 124 of these were in Tokyo. Cases in Tokyo and Kagoshima prefecture were linked to nightlife establishments such as host bars. Tokyo Governor Yuriko Koike reminded residents to avoid such venues, but did not impose any closures or restrictions. Chief Cabinet Secretary Yoshihide Suga stated "there was no need to reinstate the state of emergency that was lifted on 25 May". Closures due to the pandemic had resulted in a recession for January–March.

On 4 July, 262 cases were reported nationwide. Tokyo reported 131 new cases. 23 cases were in Kagoshima, 17 in Osaka, and 9 in Kyoto. Infections among young people continued to be primarily linked to nightlife establishments. Yamagata Prefecture had its first confirmed case since 4 May.

On 5 July 208 new cases of new coronavirus were confirmed nationwide. It was the third consecutive day that the number of new infections exceeded 200. In Tokyo, the number of people infected with "downtown at night" such as host clubs and cabaret clubs is increasing. According to the city, 46 cases out of 111 people were related to the city at night, the Shinjuku area is 38 people, Ikebukuro area was 4 people. Of the people 111, are in their 20s and 30s in 73 people together, account for about 66 percent of the total. Also, of the 111 people, 58 are close contacts of people who have been confirmed to have been infected, and 53 have no known route of infection. New infections have also been confirmed around Tokyo, with 21 in Saitama, 20 in Kanagawa, and 7 in Chiba. As a result, this brought the total number of confirmed cases in Tokyo to 6,765.

The number of people infected with the new coronavirus was also confirmed in Kyushu on 5 July. Kagoshima Prefecture has confirmed 13 men and women in their teens and 50s. They were both visitors and contacts at a show pub in Kagoshima, where clusters were believed to have occurred. Nine new infections have been confirmed in Fukuoka Prefecture. Four of the men and women in their 20s and 50s in Fukuoka are members-only snacks in Fukuoka, where customers and employees have been confirmed to be infected. A total of seven people were infected with the shop, two employees and five customers, and the city believes a new cluster has occurred. This is the seventh case of cluster outbreak in the city. In Miyazaki, men in their 40s were also confirmed to be infected. It has been confirmed in Miyazaki Prefecture since 11 April.

On 6 July 176 new cases of the new coronavirus were confirmed in Japan. The number of new infections in Tokyo was 102, exceeding 100 for the fifth consecutive day. In addition, there were 16 people in Saitama, 11 people in Kanagawa, and 12 people in Kagoshima. At the same day, revamped government expert panel gave the go-ahead to the plan to take a further step away from emergency mode, on the premise that preventive measures against the virus are taken, said economic revitalization minister Yasutoshi Nishimura, who is in charge of the government's coronavirus response.

On 7 July 106 new cases of COVID-19 were confirmed in Tokyo, according to a report from the Tokyo metropolitan government. The number of people infected per day in Tokyo exceeded 100 for the sixth straight day, and the average number of people infected per week exceeded 100. In response to the increase in the number of people infected in Tokyo, Yuriko Koike asked Tokyo residents to refrain from moving outside the city without any urgent need since 4 July. According to Jiji Press, Japan's Chief Cabinet Secretary Yoshihide Suga told a press conference on 7 July that he conveyed to Tokyo Governor Yuriko Koike's view that the government has not uniformly asked for restraint on cross-regional movement. "It is better to refrain from moving (inter-regional) for people with poor physical condition, etc., but I don't think it is necessary to uniformly ask to refrain from moving," Japan's Chief Cabinet Secretary Suga forcefully stressed. Chief Cabinet Secretary Suga said that Yasutoshi Nishimura, Minister of Economic, Financial and Renewal, delivered the position to Governor Koike. According to a summary article of people infected nationwide in the Mainichi Shimbun, 214 new coronavirus cases were confirmed nationwide on 7 July. There are 20,866 people infected in Japan, including cruise ship passengers. One person died in Saitama and Chiba prefectures, with a total of 993 dead. Recent cases of infection in Tokyo are not only related to downtown areas in their 20s and 30s, but also have many cases where routes are unknown. As of 7 July, there were 27 new infections in Saitama, 12 people in Osaka, 11 people in Chiba, 9 people in Kanagawa, Kyoto and Kagoshima.

July 8–14 
Tokyo confirmed 75 new cases of COVID-19 Wednesday, marking the first time the daily figure in the capital has fallen below 100 in a week, the metropolitan government said. Wednesday's figure, which brings the cumulative number of novel coronavirus infections in Tokyo to 7,048, is the first double-digit figure since 1 July, when 67 cases were reported. In Saitama prefecture, a total of 48 people were confirmed to be infected on the 8th, and the number was the highest per day after the emergency declaration was released on 25 May. In Kanagawa prefecture, a woman in her 90s who was diagnosed with a new coronavirus infection die. She was admitted to Shonan Izumi Hospital (Izumi Ward, Yokohama City) on the 8th in Kanagawa Prefecture, and 23 people (including the same city, Kawasaki, Sagamihara and Fujisawa) were found to have been infected. The number of infected people after the declaration of emergency was the third highest after 31 on 30 and 24 June on 3 July. Kawasaki Kyodo Hospital was confirmed to have newly infected a caregiver woman in her 50s and three men and women in their 70s and 80s who were in the same room and ward as the patient who was found positive. On 8 July, NHK Broadcasting in Japan reported that 207 people were diagnosed with COVID-19 on the same day by summing up the counts of the Ministry of Health, Labor and Welfare and the local governments. In addition, on the same day, one fatality occurred in Yamagata and Kanagawa Prefecture, and the total number of deaths from COVID-19 increased to 995 (including cruise ships).

On 9 July, the number of daily COVID-19 cases in Tokyo hit a single-day record of 224 on Thursday, the metropolitan government said. The number of infected people per day exceeded 206 on 17 April, the highest number ever. Gov. Yuriko Koike told reporters in the morning that the number of people tested in Shinjuku Ward around seven days led to an increase in positive tests on the 9th, and said, "The number of seriously ill and dead has been suppressed these days." The metropolitan government held a meeting with experts on the afternoon of the 9th to announce the results of its analysis of the current state of the city based on new indicators to warn against the "next wave. Of the four levels according to the severity level, the medical service system was raised from the current state of "I think it is necessary to prepare for strengthening" to the second state of "I think it is necessary to strengthen." On the other hand, the second highest level of infection, the current assessment of infection, was maintained. Under the government's easing guidelines, the maximum number of participants, including events, intended to be raised from 1,000 to 5,000 from the same day, and professional baseball and the J. League will hold games from the same day.

In Japan, a total of 355 new infections were confirmed in 19 prefectures and airport quarantine on 9 July, bringing the total to 20,763. The number of new infections per day has reached the 300 level since 2 May during the emergency declaration, which is the first time since the declaration was lifted. In Osaka Prefecture, 30 men and women between elementary school children and 60s were confirmed to be infected, with 20 of them unknown. The number of new infections of more than 30 people in the prefecture since 29 April, accounting for 78% of 129 people in their 18s to 30s who were found to have been infected between June and 8 July. COVID-19 patients in Japan were chartered and 2,768 were returned to China after 14 confirmed infections and those identified as confirmers during the airport quarantine process. In addition, the distribution of 27,768 Japanese, Chinese travellers and patients returning home infected with COVID-19 in Japan adds 224 to 7,272, accounting for one-third of the total. Among the infected, 36 patients were seriously ill, including 35 patients in Japan and one on board a diamond Princess cruise ship, as of Tuesday.

In the midst of 10 July, Tokyo, neighbouring prefectures and other major cities began to see a simultaneous surge in new cases of COVID-19 in the past few days, forcing policymakers to weigh public health concerns against business closure requests that would risk further damage to the economy. The number of daily COVID-19 infections in Tokyo reached a new single-day record of 243 on Friday, Gov. Yuriko Koike said, marking the second consecutive day of over 200 new cases in the capital. “I believe we have reached a stage when we need to be more cautious,” Tokyo Governor Yuriko Koike said at a news conference on 10 July, referring to the surge in new infections that started early this month. According to NHK Broadcasting, as of 8:30 pm on the 10th, a total of 411 confirmed people, including 243 in Tokyo, 32 in Kanagawa, 27 in Saitama, and 22 in Osaka, were confirmed by COVID-19. It is only about two and a half months since 24 April, when the “declaration of emergencies” related to COVID-19 was issued to Japan, with more than 400 daily confirmed people. Among them, the number of confirmed people in Tokyo was 243, setting the highest number on the previous day. The cumulative number of confirmed patients, which was 7,272 by the previous day, increased to 7,515.

According to sources, 206 new coronavirus cases were confirmed in Tokyo on Tuesday. The number of people infected reached the 200-point mark for the third consecutive day, following 224 on 9 July and 243 on 10 July. The total number of people infected was 7,721. In Japan, 385 new cases of new coronavirus infection were confirmed in Japan. The total number of infected people was 21,528. The number of passengers on the cruise ship "Diamond Princess" is 22,240. An infection was found after one person in Kanagawa died, with a total of 996 dead. It was the third consecutive day that there were more than 300 people. In Tokyo, 206 people were over 200 for three consecutive days. The number of people in Kanagawa was 34, the highest after the declaration of emergency. As side references for data, there were 35 people newly added in Saitama, 13 people newly added in Chiba, and 28 people newly added in Osaka.

On 11 July, Osaka Prefecture announced 28 new cases, most of whom could not trace the origin of their infection. The prefecture held a meeting to discuss countermeasures. It was announced that the parade for the Jidai Matsuri festival in Kyoto would be cancelled because of the pandemic. Two United States Marine Corps bases in Okinawa Prefecture were put on lockdown by the US military after 61 cases were reported at the bases. Yoshihide Suga, then the Chief Cabinet Secretary, called the national increase in cases "a Tokyo-centred problem". The government announced plans to allow foreigners, including international students, to re-enter Japan after travelling abroad as long as they had a negative PCR test. The government also announced the possibility of working with 10 neighboring countries to resume business travel between them, following the easing of entry restrictions for business travelers from Vietnam, Thailand, Australia and New Zealand in June.

On July 12, Japan reported 409 new coronavirus cases, including 206 in Tokyo, 32 in Osaka Prefecture, and 31 in Chiba Prefecture. The opposition party demanded that the state of emergency be reinstated, but the government refused, stating that most new cases were young people, there were still plenty of hospital beds available, and that restrictions would negatively affect the economy.

On July 13, with hundreds of coronavirus infections in Japan for the fourth day in a row, the government has launched a campaign to encourage travelling domestically in Japan, raising concerns over the spread of the virus. Japan's tourism agency announced the "Go to Travel" project on 10 July, which will invest 1.6794 trillion yen in the government's supplementary budget. The campaign, which will go into effect on 22 July, aims to boost domestic consumption and offers discounts of up to 35 per cent on tourism, travel, transportation, restaurant and entertainment. Local media, including NHK, also pointed out that "in large cities such as Tokyo, where the number of infected people is increasing, there are voices concerned that the population movement will increase and spread." Legal circles are recruiting plaintiffs and lawyers for class action suits against the project under the name of "Stop Go To Travel." As the controversy grew, Yastoshi Nishimura, Minister of Economic revitalization in charge of COVID-19 response, held a press conference on 12 July and explained, "We must proceed with the campaign while paying attention to the spread of the infection. We can thoroughly prevent infection and promote the compatibility of economic and social activities." He also stressed, "If you are in bad shape, please refrain from going out, and refrain from crossing the prefecture."

On 13 July, 261 new cases were reported, for a total of 22,318. In Hokkaido, the total number of deaths reached 984. Tokyo reported 119 new cases (with one cluster of 37 from a live music theatre in Shinjuku), Saitama Prefecture had 26, Osaka Prefecture had 18, and Chiba and Kanagawa Prefectures each had 17. 32 new cases at Marine Corps Air Station Futenma, all American personnel, were also reported.

On 14 July, the Tokyo Metropolitan Government announced that 143 new coronavirus cases were reported. The number of infected people fell below 200 a day in a row. The total number of people infected was 8,189. There were no reports of the dead. By age group, 64 people were in their 20s, followed by 29 in their 30s. It was 65% in their 20s and 30s. Among those who know the route of infection, 21 were employees of restaurants and customers, 13 were in facilities such as nursery schools and kindergartens, 17 were in the workplace and 10 were in the home. As of 11:15 p.m. on 14th, 333 new cases of the new coronavirus were confirmed in Japan. Three prefectures in the Tokyo metropolitan area accounted for 238 or 70 per cent of the total, and some in the prefectures may have been infected with the disease. In the Tokyo metropolitan area, 143 people were infected with the disease, 42 in Saitama Prefecture, 28 in Kanagawa Prefecture and 25 in Chiba Prefecture. In western Japan, 20 people were found to be in Osaka Prefecture, 12 in Kyoto Prefecture, and nine in Hyogo Prefecture. In Gifu Prefecture, three men and women were found infected. A man in his 20s in Ogaki reportedly ate in the prefecture with an infected person in Aichi Prefecture on the 9th. A teenage unemployed woman in Gifu is a strong contact with a man in his 20s confirmed to have been infected and went to the city on the JR Sekido Line on the 6th to meet him. In Hiroshima, a man in his 30s who belongs to the GSDF's Kaida garrison was found infected. The man lived in the city and visited Osaka Prefecture on private business between 3 and 5 July. The city government believes the man is highly likely to have been infected in Osaka Prefecture and is seeking to identify a strong contact.

It was reported that there were a total of 479 confirmed patients who had contacted the health authorities after receiving a positive test in Tokyo, the capital of Japan, where the number of people infected with COVID-19 was rapidly increasing. Japanese media, including the Mainichi Shimbun, reported that 396 confirmed patients in Tokyo were in hospital or in accommodations as of the 13th, but some of them were out of contact. Japan's Chief Cabinet Secretary Suga said, "We have repeatedly called for more medical staff and accommodation facilities in Tokyo. We will also provide necessary support as a nation." Meanwhile, with the number of COVID-19 confirmed in Japan soaring recently, the Japanese government and Tokyo are engaged in a heated debate over who should be responsible. Japan's Chief Cabinet Secretary Yoshihide Suga said in a lecture in Hokkaido on the 11th, "It is no overstatement to say that the issue is obviously a 'Tokyo problem' and that Tokyo accounts for more than half of the new infections recently." In response, Tokyo Governor Yuriko Koike said at a press conference on the previous day, "Those who are in bad shape are appealing not to go out of Tokyo, but the government is trying to launch a 'Go To Campaign.' The response is a matter of the government." The 'Go-To campaign' is a tourism revitalization project actively pursued by the Abe government to promote domestic tourism demand, since Japan's tourism economy have been damaged by COVID-19 pandemic.

July 15–21 
On 15 July, 455 new cases were reported. 165 new COVID-19 cases were confirmed in Tokyo. Tokyo Governor Yuriko Koike asked residents not to travel outside of Tokyo or visit dining and nightlife establishments with poor COVID-19 prevention measures. The prefecture with the highest caseload was Osaka Prefecture, with 61. 43 people were positive in Kanagawa Prefecture. 13 cases were confirmed in Hokkaido.

On 19 July 511 new cases of the new coronavirus were confirmed nationwide. The number of newly infected people in Tokyo was 188, down from 200 for the first time in four days. The Osaka prefectural government, with 89 people, renewed the largest number since the declaration of emergency was lifted, following 92 people on 9 April, the largest number of people in the day. Fukuoka Prefecture had the largest number of people since the declaration was cancelled. The city of Saitama revealed on the 18th that one person infected was re-positive. Of the 188 people in Tokyo, 118 (63 percent) do not know the route of infection at this time. By age group, 84 people in their 20s and 45 people in their 30s accounted for 70% of the total. However, 26 people in their 40s, 13 in their 50s, 7 in their 60s, and 6 in their 70s. Governor Yuriko Koike told reporters late that night, "It's generational." The number of people who were seriously ill increased by two to 12 from the previous day and said, "It's important not only to change the number of positive patients, but also to reduce the number of people who were seriously ill. I want to take measures to deal with the elderly."

On 20 July 419 new coronavirus cases were confirmed in Japan. The total number of domestic infections was 25,791, including 26,503 passengers on cruise ship Diamond Princess. Two people died in Tokyo and Saitama, with a total of 1,001 dead. Tokyo had 168 people, who have been moving in almost three digits in July. Osaka had 49 people, Fukuoka had 32 people, Saitama had 29 people, Kyoto had 27 people, and Chiba had 18 people.  The number of infected people per day was the highest ever in Kyoto prefecture, 27, and the number of infected people was confirmed in Saga prefecture since 16 May and in Ehime prefecture since 27 May. The infection in Ehime Prefecture was confirmed in a man in his 20s who had returned from Kyoto Prefecture to his parents' home in Uwajima City. In Osaka Prefecture, 49 people were reported infected, of which nearly 80 percent were in their 30s and younger. According to the Osaka public health center, 182 temporary inspection stations were installed in downtown Minami, Osaka, with a positive rate of 19.2 percent. Osaka Prefecture has set up a temporary inspection center in light of a series of youth infections in southern areas.

On 21 July 631 new coronavirus cases were confirmed in Japan, and the number of new coronavirus cases so far reached 26,422.27,134 passengers, including the Diamond Princess cruise ship. The number of deaths increased by one in Saitama to 1,002. Tokyo had 237 people, more than 200 for the first time in three days. Aichi and Fukuoka each had a record 53 people. Gifu also has 14 people, the highest number ever. There are 47 others in Saitama, 30 in Kanagawa, 20 in Kyoto and 72 in Osaka. The Tokyo metropolitan government has 237 cases. Ninety-six people in their 40s or older account for 40 percent of the total, and the infection has spread to middle-aged and elderly people. According to the Tokyo metropolitan government, three employees and 16 users of rehabilitation were found to have been infected at a psychiatric clinic in Edogawa Ward, with a total of 21. Since the beginning of July, 100 to 200 patients have been confirmed every day, and the number of hospitalized patients has increased to 949. Governor Yuriko Koike said on 21 July that she had secured about 2,400 beds for people with serious illnesses. About 900 beds have been expanded from before, and the metropolitan government is not in a situation where the beds are tight.

July 22–31 
On 22 July, there were 795 new COVID-19 confirmed reporters across Japan, replacing 720 on 11 April, the previous high, according to Japan's NHK. The cumulative number of confirmed cases in Japan increased to 28,798. In particular, in Tokyo, the capital city where the spread of COVID-19 infection is the most serious, only 238 new diagnoses emerged, and the cumulative number of cases exceeded 10,000. In addition, a number of new confirmers were poured from various regions, including 121 in Osaka Prefecture, 68 in Kanagawa Prefecture, and 64 in Aichi Prefecture.

As the Japanese government started the "Go-Too Travel" project to promote tourism in Japan on the same day, there are growing concerns that the spread of COVID-19 could become even more steep. The project, which will cost 1.35 trillion yen, calls for subsidizing 50 percent of domestic travel costs (up to 20,000 yen per night). In the face of the continued spread of COVID-19, the Japanese government has decided to exclude trips from or arriving from Tokyo, where the number of confirmed people has soared. "We will thoroughly implement measures to prevent infection," Japanese Prime Minister Shinzo Abe said at the prime minister's residence, adding that his policy of carefully resuming economic activities under the cooperation of the people remains unchanged.

As the re-expansion of the COVID-19 pandemic has become serious, the hosting of the 2020 Summer Olympics, which was postponed until 23 July next year, has become uncertain. Yoshiro Mori, chairman of Tokyo's Olympic and Paralympic organizing committee, told NHK on the same day that "if COVID-19 is not recovered as soon as possible and continues as it is now, it is impossible to hold the Olympics," referring to the possibility of cancellation." In April, he also mentioned the possibility of "cancellation" rather than "acting" the Olympics. Chairman Mori expressed negative stances on both the Olympic re-enactment and the potential for unrelated spectators. He said, “It is difficult to reperform because the Winter Olympics in Beijing, China in 2022, and the Paris Olympics in France in 2024 have already been decided. There may be a story about the end of the competition.”

According to Japan's NHK, on 23 July 981 new confirmers appeared throughout the day, replacing the highest daily record of 795 the day before. In particular, 366 people were infected only in the capital city of Tokyo, and since the outbreak of COVID-19, the number of new confirmed patients surpassed 300 for the first time. In addition, COVID-19 is spreading out of control, recording more than 100 people for 15 consecutive days. Meanwhile, the Japanese government decided to open a COVID-19 countermeasures headquarters and start consultations with 12 countries and regions where infections are stabilizing for mutual entry into business. The Subject country of consultation for this topic are South Korea, China, Taiwan, Singapore and Hong Kong.

On 23 July (one day before would have been marked the start of the Olympics), 981 new cases of coronavirus were confirmed in Japan, with 28,197 infected so far on the start of a 4-day long holiday weekend. 28,909 passengers, including the Diamond Princess cruise ship. The death toll increased by one in Hokkaido and one in Saitama, respectively, to a total of 1,005 people. Tokyo had 366 people, far exceeding the previous record of 293 people. Aichi had a record high of 97 people, Saitama had 64 people, Shiga had 17 people, Nara had 13 people and Wakayama had 9 people. Hyogo has the largest number of people since the emergency was declared. There are 104 people in Osaka, 53 people in Kanagawa and 33 people in Chiba.

On 24 July (a day to the original start of the Olympics), 768 new coronavirus cases were confirmed in Japan. The total number of people infected was 28,895. Including crew members of the cruise ship Diamond Princess, there were 29,677 deaths, with a total of 1,008 deaths confirmed in Saitama, Kyoto and Osaka. 260 new infections in Tokyo, exceeding 200 for the fourth consecutive day. Osaka has reached a record high of 149. Others were 63 in Aichi, 52 in Fukuoka and 45 in Saitama. There were 260 people infected in Tokyo, 186 of whom were in their 20s and 30s, accounting for about 70%. More than 200 patients were admitted to the hospital for the fourth consecutive day, exceeding 1,000 for the first time in about two months. At the Tokyo Metropolitan Children's Medical Center (Fuchu City), four doctors and others were confirmed to have been infected, and the center announced that they would partially restrict patient acceptance due to safety measure for preventive protection of patients and employees. According to the Osaka prefectural government, the number of PCR tests was 1,150 with a positive rate of 13 percent. Positive rates exceeded 10 percent on 19 July, but before that, they went back to 26 April, when the emergency was declared. The rate of infection unknown was 61%. In Aichi Prefecture, 63 people were confirmed to have been infected, and the number of people infected per day exceeded 50 for the fourth straight day. Forty-nine young people in their thirties or younger accounted for about 80 percent. Fourteen people were found positive in Kagoshima Prefecture. Eleven of them were residents of remote islands and Yoron Island, with 23 infected. The prefecture has asked people in and out of the prefecture to refrain from visiting the island.

The number of confirmed Japanese COVID-19 people has exceeded 30,000. In the capital city of Tokyo, over 200 confirmed persons were reported for the fifth consecutive day. According to NHK and support communication, the number of new patients was 787 on the 25th, and the cumulative number of patients was 30,527 (including those who confirmed the cruise ship Diamond Princess) and exceeded 30,000. In addition, 787 people nationwide, including 295 from Tokyo, the epicenter of the COVID-19 Pandemic, 132 from Osaka Prefecture, 78 from Aichi Prefecture, 50 from Fukuoka, and 35 from Saitama Prefecture, were confirmed by COVID-19. The number of confirmed cases in Tokyo has become more serious, and 295 new cases of infection have occurred in Tokyo. Almost all young people in Tokyo were young, and 185 people in their 20s and 30s were 185 people, or about 63% of the new cases. Among the infected people in Japan, one more person died in Tokyo and Nagasaki, and the death toll from cruise ships is 1,009 so far. Yasushi Nishimura, who leads the COVID-19 countermeasure, held a press conference on the day and said, "The number of infected people is moving at a very high level." However, the possibility of declaring an emergency was not mentioned. Prime Minister Shinzo Abe also reportedly told reporters at the official residence that he said, “The number of infected people is increasing and watching them with tension.” In addition, infection is spreading at U.S. military bases in Japan. Okinawa Prefecture said it received a call from the U.S. military that 64 people were confirmed to have been infected by the confirmed number of confirmed cases per day at U.S. military facilities in Japan, including Futenma Base and Camp Hansen. So far, 229 U.S. military officials have been confirmed in Okinawa, exceeding the number of people infected with Okinawa. According to Japan's NHK, 835 newly COVID-19 confirmed patients were reported throughout Japan on 26 July. This is the second-largest after 981, the record high on 23 July.  The number of newly confirmed people in the capital city of Tokyo stood at 239, marking the sixth consecutive day of 200, while the number of newly confirmed people in Osaka also exceeded 100 for the fifth consecutive day with 141 people. In addition, Fukuoka Prefecture (90 people), Hyogo Prefecture (49 people), and Kumamoto Prefecture (21 people) broke the record.

On 27 July 596 new coronavirus cases were confirmed in Japan. It was the first time in seven days since the 20th that the number had fallen below 600. It is believed that the number of tests decreased during the holidays, leading to a decrease in the number of infected people. Above all, there were 131 people in Tokyo, which had more than 200 for 6 days in a row, and 87 in Osaka, which had been over 100 for 5 straight days in a row. According to Tokyo, 79% of the infected people are young people in their 20s to 30s. Besides, there were 10 people who were related to "nightlife downtown", 14 people who were infected with domestic infections and 9 people who were infected with workplace infections. Meanwhile, there were 79 unknown routes of infection. Moreover, there are also 76 people in Aichi and 18 in Okinawa, which is the highest number per day. After all, the total number of infected people so far has reached 31,203 as date of 27 July. As a result, a total of 31,915 people were infected, including passengers on board the cruise ship Diamond Princess, bringing the death toll to 1,012 after a new confirmed death in Kyoto.

As of 10 p.m. on 28 July 980 newly COVID-19 confirmed patients in Japan were identified, according to Japanese public broadcaster NHK. The figure is the second-highest since 23 July, when the daily number of newly confirmed patients reached 981. As a result, Japan's cumulative number of confirmed numbers increased to 32,956. The death toll increased to 1,015, with three deaths. On this day, the capital Tokyo recorded 266 new confirmed people and Osaka recorded 155. The number of newly confirmed patients in Aichi Prefecture reached 110, exceeding 100 for the first time. Japan's confirmed number has increased by nearly 6,000 in the past week. Besides, the distribution of 3,244 people, including Japanese, Chinese travelers, and returning patients infected with COVID-19 in Japan, has surpassed a third of the total number of Tokyo by 1,161. Furthermore, there were 553 people who were exposed to airport quarantine, 173 people returning from China to charter flights, government employees, and quarantine officers. Among the infected, the number of severe patients in the ventilator or intensive care room increased to 76 in Japan only on the 28th. There were 22,811 out of the confirmed cases in Japan until 28 July, and a total of 23,470 diamond princess passengers. The number of PCR tests carried out on 26 July was 7908 during the day, according to the report. Meanwhile, Kyodo News reported on 28 July that a police officer in charge of guarding Japanese Defense Minister Taro Kono was also confirmed to have been diagnosed with COVID-19. Defense Minister Kono was tested negative on the day and plans to proceed as scheduled after the 29th.

On 29 July, Japan reported over 1,000 new cases of COVID-19. Osaka, Aichi, Fukuoka and Okinawa prefectures all set single-day records for new infections according to media reports. It was suggested that the large increase came as a result of a four-day holiday from 22–26 July. 250 of the new cases came from Tokyo. Iwate Prefecture, the last remaining prefecture without any cases, reported its first two cases. 

On 30 July, 1,305 new cases were reported. Urban areas in particular reported record numbers of infections. 367 new cases were reported in Tokyo, bringing the city's cases to 12,228. Many of the infected were between 20–30 years old; in response, the metropolitan government asked restaurants and karaoke bars to reduce their hours until the end of August. 

On July 31, 1,578 new cases were reported, with 463 in Tokyo. The Osaka prefectural government requested that venues serving alcohol either shut completely or reduce their hours until August 20.

August–September 2020 
During August, the circumstantial consequences had been getting worse, officially reported nationwide daily record never concluded below two-digits. Eventually, ratings of PM Abe's cabinet became critical and critics over PM Abe's decision threatens PM Abe's career and Jiminto's reputation. As a result, PM Abe declared that he would pass over the duty as Prime Minister of Japan to future leader of Japan.

On 12 August, the number of infections in Japan exceeded 50,000.

On 22 August, the number of infections in Japan exceeded 60,000.

On 4 September, the total number of infections exceeded 70,000.

On 24 September, the total number of infections exceeded 80,000, due to declining numbers of reports for the daily record of infected people.

October–December 2020 
On 5 October, Japan overtook China in terms of the number of infections. On 14 October, the total number of contracted infections in Japan exceeded 90,000 despite a decrease in diagnosed people reported in past several weeks. At the end of October, the total number of infections in Japan exceeded 100,000 as the daily report of transmittion was recorded from 300 people to 700 people in October.

On 17 November, there were 1,699 cases of contracted infection in Japan, including 298 infected people in Tokyo. On 18 November, there were 2,202 cases of contracted infection in Japan, including 493 people who were found infected in Tokyo. On 19 November, there were 2,387 cases of contracted infection in Japan, including 534 people who were diagnosised positive in Tokyo. On 20 November, there were 2,426 cases of contracted infection in Japan, including 504 people who were found positive for infection in Tokyo. On 21 November, there were 2,596 cases of contracted infection in Japan, including 539 people who were tested positive for infection in Tokyo. As the pandemic surged inside Japan, national government eventually excluded Sapporo and Osaka region from 'Go to Travel' Campaign on 24 November. As the pandemic surged inside Tokyo, Yuriko Koike announced that they will strongly recommend restaurants to shorten business hours amid virus for three weeks Although more than 2,000 people tested positive for COVID-19 on 26 November, Japanese government officials disappointingly disagreed with resolving the public health crisis caused by the COVID-19 pandemic.

At the beginning of December, the Liberal Democratic Party on Monday proposed extending the Go To Travel tourism promotion campaign through the end of the Golden Week holidays in early May. As of 2 December, although there were less than 2,000 new cases in Japan in seven days following 25 November, the cumulative number of confirmed cases in Japan exceeded 150,000. On 3 December, Japan reported 2,498 new cases. 36 new deaths were reported, of which 11 came from the northern prefecture of Hokkaido.  In Tokyo, 533 people tested positive.

2021 
On 13 January, the applying region of the state of emergency was expanded to 11 cities including Tochigi, Gifu, Aichi, Kyoto, Osaka, Hyogo and Fukuoka.

2022 
The isolation period for travellers to Japan was reduced to seven days.

References

External links
 – includes situation reports of the outbreak in Japan.
 In English: 

 In English: 

 In English: 
 In English: 
 In English: 
 In English: 
 In English: 
 In English: 
Coronavirus COVID-19 Global Cases and historical data by Johns Hopkins University

COVID-19 pandemic in Japan
Japan
COVID-19